Thiago Alves was the defending champion, but he lost to Horacio Zeballos in the quarterfinals.
Ricardo Mello defeated 6–2, 6–4 Paul Capdeville in the final.

Seeds

Draw

Final four

Top half

Bottom half

External links
Main Draw
Qualifying Draw

Prime Cup Aberto de Sao Paulo
2009 - Singles
2009 in Brazilian tennis